The 1943 Cork Senior Football Championship was the 55th staging of the Cork Senior Football Championship since its establishment by the Cork County Board in 1887. 

Clonakilty entered the championship as the defending champions.

On 17 October 1943, Clonakilty won the championship following a 2-05 to 1-04 defeat of Fermoy in the final. This was their third championship title overall and their second title in succession.

Results

Final

References

Cork Senior Football Championship